University of Tartu basketball team, for sponsorship reasons known as Tartu Ülikool Maks & Moorits, is a professional basketball team based in Tartu, Estonia. The team plays in the Latvian–Estonian Basketball League. They play their home games at the University of Tartu Sports Hall.

Founded in 1937 as division of the University of Tartu Academic Sports Club, the team have won a record 26 Estonian Championships, a record 17 Estonian Cups and one Soviet Championship.

History
The team was founded in 1937 by Herbert Niiler as Tartu Estonian Academic Sports Club, or simply Tartu EASK. The team won the regional series and was promoted to the top-tier Estonian Championship. Led by Estonia national team players Oskar Erikson, Aleksander Illi, Heino Veskila and Ralf Viksten, the team won the 1938 Estonian Championship and managed to defend the title in the two following seasons. The club's success was cut short by World War II and the Soviet occupation.

University of Tartu returned to the Estonian Championship in 1948. On 28 August 1948, the team defeated Tartu Dünamo with a record score of 132–6, with Ilmar Kullam scoring 40 points. Led by a generation of star players such as Kullam, Heino Kruus and Joann Lõssov, the team won five consecutive Estonian Championships from 1948 to 1952. In 1949, the team also won the Soviet Championship.

The team, now coached by Ernst Ehaveer, won another Estonian Championship in 1956 with a team of players from different generations like the veteran Kullam and the young Mart Laga. In 1957, center Jaak Lipso joined the team and Tartu won two more championships in 1958 and 1959. After Lipso's departure, the team struggled in the 1960s before acquiring Aleksei Tammiste in 1968. The team won the 1968–69 season by defeating Tallinna Kalev 82–80 in the final, fielding an unorthodox starting lineup of 4 guards and 1 forward. Led by Tammiste and Anatoli Krikun, the team won eight Estonian Championships from 1969 to 1978. In 1983, Ehaveer ended his 27-season tenure as the head coach. Under Ehaveer, the team had won a total of 11 Estonian Championships and 5 Estonian Cups. In the 1980s, the team entered into a period of decline, failing to finish above third place.

Tartu continued to struggle after the restoration of Estonia's independence in 1991. In the 1995–96 season, the team reached the finals, but lost the series to Kalev 0–3. In 1997, University of Tartu hired Teet Laur as head coach. In 1998, the team signed Marek Doronin. University of Tartu finished the 1999–2000 regular season in third place, but reached the finals in the playoffs and won their first title since 1978, defeating Tallinna Kalev in three games. The team also made their debut in Europe, entering the 1999–2000 FIBA Saporta Cup, but failed to advance past the group stage with just one win in 10 games. In 2000, Jüri Neissaar returned to the team and replaced Laur as head coach. The team defended their KML title in the 2000–01 season, defeating Tallinna Ülikoolid-A. Le Coq in three games in the finals. Tanel Tein was named Most Valuable Player of the season, while Neissaar won the Coach of the Year. The team failed to win their third consecutive KML title as Tartu lost the series to Tallinna Kalev 2–3. Nevertheless, Tein was named MVP for the second year in a row.

In 2003, Tõnu Lust was hired as head coach. University of Tartu won the 2003–04 regular season and won the title, defeating EBS/Nybit in 4 games to 2 in the finals. Augenijus Vaškys was named MVP and Lust won the Coach of the Year award. The team finished the 2004–05 regular season with a 12–4 record, but lost the finals to Ehitustööriist 3 games to 4. After the season, Lust was replaced as head coach by the assistant coach Paavo Russak. The team reached the finals in the 2005–06 season, but were once again defeated by Kalev/Cramo (former Ehitustööriist) 3 games to 4, losing the deciding seventh game by a single point, 68–69. Despite the loss, Tein was named MVP of the season for the third time. University of Tartu signed Gert Kullamäe, Martin Müürsepp and Giorgi Tsintsadze for the 2006–07 season, while Algirdas Brazys replaced Russak as head coach. The team won the regular season and reached the finals in the playoffs, where they defeated Kalev/Cramo 4 games to 2. Tein was named the KML Finals MVP. Üllar Kerde was hired as the new head coach for the next season. University of Tartu competed in the 2007–08 FIBA EuroCup and made Estonian basketball history by reaching the Final Four, where they were defeated by Barons LMT 82–88 in the semifinals. In the third place games, the team faced Proteas EKA AEL, but lost 70–79. University of Tartu defended their KML title in the 2007–08 season, defeating Kalev/Cramo in a four-game sweep in the finals. Brian Cusworth was named the KML Finals MVP, in addition to regular-season MVP, while Tein was named Estonian Player of the Year and Kerde won the Coach of the Year award.

On 20 December 2008, Kerde was replaced by assistant coach Indrek Visnapuu. University of Tartu won the 2008–09 regular season and advanced to the finals in the playoffs. In the finals, the team faced Kalev/Cramo once again and lost the series 2 games to 4. The team won the 2009–10 season, defeating Rakvere Tarvas 4 games to 2 in the finals. Janar Talts was named KML Finals MVP. On 25 January 2012, Visnapuu was replaced by assistant coach and former University of Tartu player Gert Kullamäe. The team won their next Estonian Championship in the 2014–15 season, defeating Kalev/Cramo 4 games to 1 in the finals. Tanel Kurbas was named the KML Finals MVP and Kullamäe won the Coach of the Year award. University of Tartu participated in the 2015–16 season of the newly established FIBA Europe Cup, reaching the round of 32. In Estonia, the team finished the 2015–16 regular season in second place. The team advanced to the finals, but were defeated by Kalev/Cramo 4 games to 1.

Sponsorship naming
The team has had several denominations through the years due to its sponsorship. From 2001 to 2016, the club was sponsored by Saku, an Estonian brewery company, which led to the team featuring Rock, one of Saku's brands, in their team name. As a result, the name Rock was used frequently to refer to the team.

Tartu Gaas: 1994–1995
SK Polaris: 1997–1999
Tartu Ülikool-Delta: 1999–2001
Tartu Ülikool/Rock: 2001–2016
Tartu Ülikool Maks & Moorits: 2019–present

Logos

Home arenas
Estonian University of Life Sciences Sports Hall (1960–1982)
University of Tartu Sports Hall (1982–present)

Players

Current roster

Depth chart

Head coaches

Aleksander Illi 1937
Oskar Erikson 1938–1940
Edgar Naarits 1948–1955
Ernst Ehaveer 1956–1983
Arne Laos 1983–1992
Jüri Neissaar 1992–1993
Tõnu Lust 1993–1994

Jüri Neissaar 1994–1997
Teet Laur 1997–2000
Jüri Neissaar 2000–2003
Tõnu Lust 2003–2005
Paavo Russak 2005–2006
Algirdas Brazys 2006–2007
Üllar Kerde 2007–2008

Indrek Visnapuu 2008–2012
Gert Kullamäe 2012–2017
Priit Vene 2017–2020
Toomas Kandimaa 2020–2021
Nikolajs Mazurs 2021–present

Season by season
From 1937

1991 onward

Trophies and awards

Trophies
Estonian Championship
Winners (26): 1938, 1939, 1940, 1948, 1949, 1950, 1951, 1952, 1956, 1958, 1959, 1968–69, 1970, 1971–72, 1972–73, 1975, 1976, 1977, 1977–78, 1999–2000, 2000–01, 2003–04, 2006–07, 2007–08, 2009–10, 2014–15

Estonian Cup
Winners (17): 1950, 1952, 1956, 1958, 1974, 1976, 1979, 2000, 2001, 2002, 2004, 2009, 2010, 2011, 2013, 2014, 2021

Soviet Championship
Winners (1): 1949

BBL Cup
Winners (1): 2010

Individual awards

Estonian Player of the Year
Tanel Tein – 2008

KML MVP
Tanel Tein – 2001, 2002, 2006
Augenijus Vaškys – 2004
Brian Cusworth – 2008

KML Play-offs MVP
Tanel Tein – 2000

KML Finals MVP
Tanel Tein – 2007
Brian Cusworth – 2008
Janar Talts – 2010
Tanel Kurbas – 2015

KML Best Defender
Janar Talts – 2015, 2016

KML Best Young Player
Veljo Vares – 2001
Rain Veideman – 2011
Arnas Velička – 2019

KML Coach of the Year
Jüri Neissaar – 2001
Tõnu Lust – 2004
Üllar Kerde – 2008
Gert Kullamäe – 2015

All-KML Team
Janar Talts – 2008, 2010, 2014, 2015, 2018
Tarmo Kikerpill – 2001, 2002, 2004, 2005
Tanel Tein – 2001, 2006, 2007, 2008
Vallo Allingu – 2004, 2006
Toomas Liivak – 2001
Toomas Kandimaa – 2002
Augenijus Vaškys – 2004
Marek Doronin – 2005
Gert Kullamäe – 2007
Brian Cusworth – 2008
Giorgi Tsintsadze – 2008
Scott Morrison – 2010
Sten Sokk – 2011
Bill Amis – 2012
Tanel Kurbas – 2014
Augustas Pečiukevičius – 2014
Janari Jõesaar – 2017
Tanel Sokk – 2018

See also
University of Tartu basketball team past rosters

References

External links
 

Tartu Ülikool/Rock
Basketball teams in Estonia
Basketball teams in the Soviet Union
Basketball teams established in 1937
Sport in Tartu
Korvpalli Meistriliiga